Russula agaricina is a fungus in the family, Russulaceae.

It was first described in 1876 as Macowania agaricina by Károly Kalchbrenner, and in 2007, based on phylogenetic evidence was  transferred to the genus, Russula, by Teresa Lebel and Jennifer Tonkin (but invalidly published). The name, Russula agaricina was validly published in 2018 by James Trappe and Todd Elliott.

References 

Taxa named by Miles Joseph Berkeley
agaricina